Virginiatown may refer to:

Virginiatown, Ontario, Canada
Virginiatown, California, United States